Caro Crawford Brown (May 25, 1908 – August 5, 2001) was a Pulitzer Prize-winning American journalist.

Biography
Caro Crawford was born in Baber, Angelina County, Texas in 1908. Her family moved to Beaumont when she was 15, and she studied journalism at the College of Industrial Arts and Sciences (now Texas Woman's University). When her education was interrupted by the start of the Great Depression in 1929, she took a job in Conroe. There she met Jack L. Brown, whom she married. The couple moved to Duval County.

Caro Brown began working for the Alice Daily Echo in 1947, initially as a proofreader, and later as a columnist, society editor, and courthouse reporter. It was in this last role that she began investigating George B. Parr, a powerful political boss in Duval and Jim Wells Counties. Parr controlled a patronage system which dominated the political and economic landscape of the region. He had fallen under scrutiny for influencing the outcome of the 1948 Democratic Senate primary in favor of Lyndon Johnson, and for a series of local political campaigns which turned violent in 1952.

Brown spent long hours attending court proceedings, requesting public documents, and researching Parr's organization. Her articles were run by the Associated Press, drawing national attention to the issue. Members of the Texas Rangers law enforcement agency advised her that she was at risk of violence from Parr's supporters – a reporter named Bill Mason had previously been killed while conducting similar investigations – and Brown began carrying a handgun in her car for self-defense.

She became personally involved during an angry courthouse confrontation between Parr and Ranger Captain Alfred Allee. Sensing that Allee was about to physically attack Parr, Brown stepped in to separate them. For her story about the incident for the Daily Echo, Brown was awarded the Pulitzer Prize for Local Reporting, Edition Time. The committee's decision read:

Though George B. Parr was not convicted for corruption, the exposure of his political machine greatly limited his influence and eventually led to a fall from power.

Caro Crawford Brown retired from journalism shortly after winning the Pulitzer. She died in Boerne, Texas in 2001 at age 93.

Honors
 Pulitzer Prize for Local Reporting, Edition Time, 1955
 Theta Sigma Phi honor society, 1955
 Texas Women's Hall of Fame, 1986
 Texas Newspaper Hall of Fame, 2016

References

External links
 

1908 births
2001 deaths
American women journalists
Journalists from Texas
People from Angelina County, Texas
Pulitzer Prize for Local Reporting winners
Women's page journalists
20th-century American journalists
20th-century American women